The 2023 South Carolina State Bulldogs football team will represent South Carolina State University as a member of the Mid-Eastern Athletic Conference (MEAC) during the 2023 NCAA Division I FCS football season. The Bulldogs are led by 22nd-year head coach Oliver Pough and play home games at Oliver C. Dawson Stadium in Orangeburg, South Carolina.

Previous season

The Bulldogs finished the 2022 season with a record of 3–8, 1-4 MEAC play to finish in last in the MEAC.

Schedule

Notes

South Carolina State
South Carolina State Bulldogs football seasons
South Carolina State Bulldogs football